Münstertal may refer to:
Val Müstair, Switzerland
Münstertal, Black Forest, Germany

see also
 Taufers im Münstertal, Italy